Formigara (locally ) is a comune (municipality) in the Province of Cremona in the Italian region Lombardy, located about  southeast of Milan and about  northwest of Cremona.

Formigara borders the following municipalities: Castelgerundo, Castiglione d'Adda, Gombito, Pizzighettone, San Bassano.

References

Cities and towns in Lombardy